Royce Peak, also known as Mount Royce, is a 13,280-foot-elevation (4,048 meter) mountain summit located west of the Royce Lakes in the Sierra Nevada mountain range in northern California, United States. It is situated in Fresno County, in the John Muir Wilderness, on land managed by Sierra National Forest. Royce Peak is the 89th highest summit in California. This mountain was named in 1929 by the California State Geographic Board, and later officially adopted by the U.S. Board on Geographic Names to honor Dr. Josiah Royce (1855–1916), philosopher, instructor, and author. The first ascent of the summit was made June 23, 1931, by Nathan Clark and Roy Crites.

Climate
According to the Köppen climate classification system, Royce Peak is located in an alpine climate zone. Most weather fronts originate in the Pacific Ocean, and travel east toward the Sierra Nevada mountains. As fronts approach, they are forced upward by the peaks, causing them to drop their moisture in the form of rain or snowfall onto the range (orographic lift). Precipitation runoff from this mountain drains south into tributaries of the San Joaquin River.

See also
List of mountain peaks of California

References

External links

 Weather forecast: Royce Peak

Sierra National Forest
Mountains of Fresno County, California
Mountains of the John Muir Wilderness
North American 4000 m summits
Mountains of Northern California
Sierra Nevada (United States)